David Edmund Turin (born 8 September 1965), known as Emit Bloch, is an American songwriter and musician.

Background
Emit Bloch is a singer, songwriter and musician known for field recordings and lo-fi music production. His parents are George L. Turin, a professor of Electrical Engineering and Computer Sciences at UC Berkeley, and Helen Elizabeth Turin, the daughter of a Utah cattle rancher. Bloch was raised in Berkeley, California, as well as Layton, Utah, and is related to Christopher Layton, a prominent 19th Century Mormon pioneer.

Career
Bloch has issued several notable collections, with his 2010 release Dictaphones Vol. 1 garnering 5/5 stars in UNCUT, the magazine calling Bloch an "exceptional songwriter" and the release "utterly remarkable", as well as frequent radio play on BBC stations when it was issued on One Little Independent records.  London's The Sun called the record "...fresh, vital, uncluttered and brilliant" and awarded it 4.5/5 stars. 
 
The subsequent digital EP, "Dorothy," included some studio versions of songs on Dictaphones Vol. 1 and received UK-wide acclaim when it was selected by The London Times as "Hot Download of the Week" and its eponymous single was championed by Dermot O'Leary, Gideon Coe and several other mainstream BBC DJs.

In 2000, Bloch wrote and recorded the occult Milla Jovovich, The People Tree Sessions, for his internet imprint Peopletree, an early example of internet marketing. The largely field recorded release was chosen as the "Pop CD of the Week" and given 4/5 stars by the newspaper The Guardian, which stated that the record was "so barking, it's great".

In the late 1990s, Bloch co-founded the experimental jamming band Banyan with Jane's Addiction drummer Stephen Perkins, Minutemen bassist Mike Watt, Beastie Boys' keyboardist Money Mark and Wilco guitarist Nels Cline and co-produced Banyan, the band's first release for Higher Octave with Perkins and The Dust Brothers. Bloch met Perkins when working with Perry Farrell to develop Teeth, an early, internet-based music and film project funded by Lollapalooza.

On Nov. 15, 2022 Bloch issued Emit Bloch: Rock, a third album-length collection of songs recorded with a band and featuring performances by Nick McCabe as well as longtime collaborator David Peters. The album was released on the imprint TFFTT, located in Del Norte County. In 2022, TFFTT also released a collection of B-Sides, Emit Bloch: Canteen  and an Xmas song, Emit Bloch: "I Misspelled Santa 'Satan'.

Discography
 Banyan (Higher Octave) 1997
 The People Tree Sessions 1998 (Cherry Red)
 Bouncy Castle (Peopletree) 2000 - out of print
 Sexy Religion Falafelelf (Peopletree/iDot/One Little Indian) 2001
 Swing Falafelelf (Peopletree/iDot/One Little Indian) 2003
 Monsta (One Little Indian) 2006
 Dictaphones Vol.1 (Lost Dogs/One Little Indian) 2010
 Collectives Vol.2 (AWAL) 2018
 Rocks (TFFTT/AWAL) 2022
 Canteen {TFFTT/AWWAL) 2022

References

External links
 BBC Radio Emit Bloch Page
 Emit Bloch page at One Little Indian Records
 Lollapalooza Teeth Project

American male journalists
Living people
1965 births
Musicians from Berkeley, California
People from Layton, Utah
Songwriters from California
Songwriters from Utah